Mackay is a Legislative Assembly of Queensland electoral district in North Queensland, Australia, encompassing the inner suburbs of the city of Mackay. Outer suburbs of the city are included in the neighbouring electorates of Mirani and Whitsunday.

Mackay has been held by the Labor Party for all but five years since 1915, when it was won by William Forgan Smith, who served as Premier of Queensland from 1932 to 1942. He retired undefeated in 1942 and was replaced by long-serving backbencher Fred Graham. Graham retired in 1969, and was succeeded by Ed Casey. Casey went on to lose Labor preselection in 1972, but recontested and won as an independent, and did so again in 1975 before being readmitted to the party in 1977. He subsequently served as Labor leader from 1978 to 1982, and later as a minister in the Goss Labor government. He was succeeded upon his retirement by Tim Mulherin, who was comfortably elected six more times, winning with more than 60% of the vote in 2006.

For the better part of a century, Mackay was a safe Labor seat, remaining in Labor hands even at the height of Joh Bjelke-Petersen's popularity.  Aside from Casey's stint as an independent, the only time Labor's grip on the seat was seriously threatened before 2012 was in 1986, when Casey was reduced to 53 percent of the two-party vote.  At the 2012 election it became the most marginal ALP seat with Mulherin winning 50.5% of the two-party preferred vote.  Mulherin was elected deputy leader of what remained of Labor; it was reduced to only seven seats.

Mulherin retired in 2015, and the seat reverted to its traditional status as a safe Labor seat, with Julieanne Gilbert retaining the seat for Labor on a swing of 12 percent.

Members for Mackay

Election results

References

External links
 

Mackay
Mackay, Queensland